The University of Arkansas System Division of Agriculture is the agricultural research center for the University of Arkansas (UA). 

The Division has over 1,650 faculty and staff members, including about 250 with PhD degrees in Agricultural Experiment Station and Cooperative Extension Service units on five university campuses, at five regional centers, seven research stations, nine specialized units and in all 75 Arkansas counties.

Organization 

The Division has five major research and extension program areas:

 Agriculture Production and Processing
 Environmental sustainability
 Food safety and security
 Health and nutrition
 4-H, youth, family and community development

Administration 
The UA vice president for Agriculture is responsible for the Division of Agriculture and reports to the President of the University . Three Associate Vice Presidents for Research, Extension and Academic Programs report to the Vice President. Programs are organized under the following departmental structure with department and unit heads who report to the  associate vice presidents:

 Agricultural Economics
 Agricultural Education, Communications and Technology
 Animal Science
 Biological and Agricultural Engineering
 Crop, Soil, and Environmental Sciences
 Entomology
 Food Science
 Forest Resources
 4-H and Youth Development
 Horticulture
 Human Environmental Sciences
 Plant Pathology
 Poultry Science

The departmental structure for research and extension programs also encompasses graduate and undergraduate degree programs under the auspices of the respective campuses.

Division funding sources in 2013 included: •

 State Appropriations - 57.0%
 Federal Appropriations - 9.1%
 County Appropriations - 2.4% 
 Federal Grants and Contracts - 11.0%
 State Grants and Contracts - 1.9%
 Private Grants and Contracts - 10.8% 
 Sales, Fees and Royalties, etc. - 7.8%

Locations 

Division of Agriculture faculty, staff and facilities support academic programs are located on UA campuses in 

 Fayetteville 
 Monticello
 Pine Bluff  
 Little Rock
 Arkansas State University in Jonesboro.

They are also based at the following locations.

 Arkansas Agricultural Research and Extension Center, Fayetteville
 Rice Research and Extension Center, Stuttgart
 Northeast Research and Extension Center, Keiser
 Southeast Research and Extension Center, Monticello
 Southwest Research and Extension Center, Hope

Research Stations and Extension Centers have resident staff to assist faculty from other Division of Agriculture locations with field research and extension projects.Fruit Research Station, Clarksville

 Livestock and Forestry Research Station, Batesville
 Lon Mann Cotton Research Station, Marianna
 Lonoke Extension Center
 Newport Extension Center
 Pine Tree Research Station, Colt
 Newport Research Station, Newport
 Rohwer Research Station
 Vegetable Research Station, Alma

Associated Research and Extension Units

 Judd Hill Plantation
 National Agricultural Law Center
 Soil Testing and Research Laboratory
 Leland Tollett Veterinary Diagnostic Laboratory
 C.A. Vines Arkansas 4-H Center

Centers of Excellence

 Arkansas Forest Resources Center
 Center of Excellence for Poultry Science

History 

The origins of the Division of Agriculture are found in the 1871 charter of the Arkansas Industrial University, now the University of Arkansas. The university was established at Fayetteville under the Morrill Land-Grant Act of 1862. The original Board of Trustees resolved that:
... the leading object shall be—without excluding other scientific and classical studies and including military tactics, to teach such branches of learning as are related to Agriculture and Mechanical Arts in order to promote the liberal and practical education of the industrial classes in the several pursuits and professions of life...(and)...To prosecute experiments for the promotion of agriculture and horticulture.

The Agricultural Experiment Station, College of Agriculture and Cooperative Extension Service were established in 1888, 1905 and 1914, respectively, in keeping with the three-part Land-Grant mission of the University of Arkansas. The agricultural research and extension programs were statewide in scope from the beginning. Extension headquarters were in Little Rock, and several branch experiment stations were established.

In 1959, the UA Board of Trustees established the Division of Agriculture as a statewide entity of the University System. The organizational structure provides for direct appropriation to the Division of Agriculture by the Arkansas General Assembly of funds for research and extension administered by the Division of Agriculture as an equal partner to the campuses and other units in the University System.

References 
Strausberg, Stephen. 1989. A Century of Research, Centennial History of the Arkansas Agricultural Experiment Station. Special Report 136. Arkansas Agricultural Experiment Station, Division of Agriculture, University of Arkansas, Fayetteville.

Zellar, Gary, and Nancy Wyatt. 1999. History of the Bumpers College, Evolution of Education in the Agricultural, Food and Life Sciences in Arkansas. Special Report 194. Arkansas Agricultural Experiment Station, Division of Agriculture, University of Arkansas, Fayetteville.

External links 
 University of Arkansas System Division of Agriculture

University of Arkansas